Nahida Nakad (Arabic: ناهدة نكد; born March 15, 1960, in Lebanon) is a Lebanese and Italian TV reporter and journalist. She was Editorial Director of FRANCE 24 TV station and Monte Carlo Doualiya Arabic language radio. Author of three books in French (Un couple dans la Guerre, A la Recherche du Liban Perdu, and Derrière Le Voile). Nahida Nakad Receives "Arab Woman of the Year" Distinction at the Takreem Arab Achievement Awards. She was the  Head of the Arabic Service at “Audiovisuel Extérieur de France” since 2009. Since 2013 she is a consultant in international relations at Public Diplomacy. She holds a Bachelor of Arts degree in Journalism and Political Science from St Mary’s College, California and the American University of Beirut.

Awards & honors 
 Arab Woman of the Year Award by the Takreem Arab Achievement Awards in 2010
 Trophée du Public de Femmes en Or 2014.

Publications 
 Un couple dans la guerre published by Calmann-Lévy
 A la Recherche du Liban Perdu published by Calmann-Lévy
 Derrière le Voile  published by Don Quixote

Personal life 
She is fluent in Arabic, French, English and Italian.

Career timeline
 1982–1985: Journalist and reporter for Al Hawadeth magazine in London
 1987-1991: Producer-journalist in TF1's bureau in Rome
 1991-1994: Journalist in TF1's foreign service in Paris
 1994–2008: Senior reporter for TF1
 2008- FEB 2012: Head of the Arabic department of France 24 and Monte Carlo Doualiya Radio
 Feb 2012 : Editorial director three language channel France 24 
 Feb 2013–present: International consultant at Public Diplomacy

References 

Living people
1960 births
Lebanese emigrants to Italy
Lebanese journalists
Italian journalists
American University of Beirut alumni
Italian war correspondents